Svenonius is a Swedish surname. Notable people with the surname include: 

Elaine Svenonius, American librarian and library scholar
Ian Svenonius (born 1968), American musician and singer
Lars Svenonius (1927–2010), Swedish logician and philosopher

Swedish-language surnames